Hans-Joachim Hartnick (born 12 January 1955) is a retired  East German cyclist. He had his best achievements in the 100 km team time trial. In this discipline he won a silver medal at the 1980 Summer Olympics, a bronze medal at the world championships in 1974 and a gold medal at the world championships in 1979; his team finished in 10th place at the 1976 Summer Olympics.

Individually, he won the following races:
 DDR-Rundfahrt, 1974 and 1975
 Hill Climb Championship, 1975
Korneuburg, 1975
Peace Race, 1976
Rund um Berlin, 1977
Thüringen Rundfahrt der U23, 1979
Tour de l'Yonne, 1981

He finished in second place in the Peace Race in 1975.

References

1955 births
Living people
People from Großräschen
People from Bezirk Cottbus
East German male cyclists
Cyclists from Brandenburg
Olympic cyclists of East Germany
Cyclists at the 1976 Summer Olympics
Cyclists at the 1980 Summer Olympics
Olympic medalists in cycling
Olympic silver medalists for East Germany
UCI Road World Champions (elite men)
Medalists at the 1980 Summer Olympics
Recipients of the Patriotic Order of Merit in bronze